Debabrata Mukherjee (born 23 March 1945) is an Indian former cricketer. He played 26 first-class matches for Bengal between 1963 and 1972.

See also
 List of Bengal cricketers

References

External links
 

1945 births
Living people
Indian cricketers
Bengal cricketers
People from Cooch Behar district